The grammar of the constructed Na'vi language was created for the movie Avatar by Paul Frommer. It is a tripartite, primarily affixing agglutinative language.

Morphophonology

Lenition
Lenition is a phonological change that is the result of the application of certain prefixes:
px (/p'/) → p
tx (/t'/) → t
kx (/k'/) → k
p → f
t or ts → s
k → h
' (/ʔ/) → ∅
Conventional notation uses + to denote a prefix that causes lenition.

Other effects 
Since Na'vi does not make the distinction between long and short vowels, if the application of an affix results in two of the same vowels in a row, it usually is shortened to one. There is also some nasal assimilation of place. Specific affixes listed hereafter will list there variants. Many prefixes combine with each other to form slight variants.

Nouns

Prefixes

Plural 
Na'vi has a singular, dual, trial and plural number. The dual prefix is me+, the trial is pxe+ and the general plural is ay+. All of these prefixes cause lenition. If the ay+ prefix causes a word to undergo lenition, the prefix may be dropped and the modified stem is also considered the general plural, and is known as the short plural.

The prefix fra- means "every".

Deixis 
The prefix fì- indicates proximal deixis. When used as a plural, it becomes fay+.

The prefix tsa- indicates distal dexis. When used as a plural, it becomes tsay+.

Other 
There is also the prefix fne- which means a type, sort or class of the noun it is attached to.

Suffixes 
The suffix -o marks the noun as indefinite (i.e. "some").

The suffix -tsyìp is used as a diminutive/endearment suffix.

The suffix  makes the noun refer to the state of the noun to which it is attached.

Gender 
Na'vi does not have grammatical gender, but it has two suffixes that indicate the gender of a noun: the feminine suffix -e and the masculine suffix -an. These are not mandatory.

Cases 
Na'vi is a tripartite language which means that the subject of an intransitive verb takes the intransitive case. The subject of a transitive verb takes the ergative case, which is -l on nouns ending with vowels and -ìl on nouns ending with consonants. The object of a transitive verb takes the accusative case, which is -t on nouns ending with a vowel and -ìt on nouns ending with a consonant.

The dative case is -r or -ru on nouns ending with a vowel, and -ìr on nouns ending with a consonant.
The genitive case is -yä, except on nouns ending with o or u, where it is -ä, or nouns ending with -ia that become -iä.
The topical case is -ri on nouns ending with a vowel, and -ìri on nouns ending with a vowel.

Nominalizers 
The suffix -yu turns a verb into an agent noun.

The prefix tì, in combination with the infix -us-, forms the gerund.

The suffix - creates a noun indicating the ability to do the verb.

Verbs 

Na'vi verbs primarily use affixes to modify their meaning. They do not conjugate for person, but for tense. Each affix has a specific location.

Positions
When an infix is added to a Na'vi syllable, the infix goes after the initial consonant but before the vowel. There are three positions where an infix is added: the pre-first preposition, which goes immediately before the first position, the first position, which goes in the penultimate syllable, and the second position, which goes in the final syllable. If the verb is monosyllabic, all three positions go after each other. If the verb is a compound, the infixes only go in the head

Pre-first position

Causative 
The causative infix is -eyk-. When a causative verb is used, the ergative becomes the dative, and the accusative remains as it is.

Reflexive 
The reflexive infix is -äp-. When it is used with -eyk-, it always comes first (-äpeyk-)

1st position

Tense infixes 
There are four types of tense infixes, which mark for the past, near past, general, near future and future tenses, and that mark for the general, imperfective, and perfective aspects
The first type are the regular ones

There are two future intent infixes.

There are also a few subjunctive infixes

Modal verbs 
Na'vi has a few modal verbs, which when used, they must take the tense affixes and the modified verb must take the general subjunctive. The subject of the modal verb takes the intransitive case.

2nd position
There are four infixes in this category, two indicating affect, two indicating speaker judgement. The infix -ei- indicate that the speaker is happy about the verb. The infix -äng- indicates that the speaker is unhappy about the verb. The variant -eiy- of -ei- is used behind i,ì, ll, and rr and the variant -eng- of -äng- is used behind i

The infix -ats- is used to indicate that the speaker is uncertain of the accuracy of his or her statement. There is also the honorific infix -uy-.

Suffixes

Adjectives 

Adjectives are created with the -a- affix. Adjectives can go before or after the noun that they modify. If the adjective is before the noun -a becomes a suffix, and if the adjective is after the noun, a- becomes a prefix. 
Compare the two ways of saying the long river (kilvan river, ngim long)
ngima kilvan
and
kilvan angim

Participles 
Na'vi has an active participle infix -us-, and the passive participle infix -awn-

Ability adjectives 
There are two prefixes that mark ability tsuk- indicates that the subject (ergative) is able to perform the verb. It is negated with ke-. These turn a verb into an adjective

From nouns 
Nouns can be turned into adjective modifiers with the prefix le-. If this kind of adjective is used after the noun in question, the a- affix is usually dropped. When it is used is after the prefix ke- they become kel-. If the ke- goes before le-, they become kel-.

Copula 
The Na'vi copula is the verb lu. They can be linked to nouns or adjectives. Number is only required to be declared once in a phrase involving lu Adjectives linked with lu are not required to have the -a- affix.
The verb lu can also be used in the sense of having. In this case, the possessor takes the dative suffix.

Questions

Yes–no 
Yes–no questions are formed with the word , which can go at the beginning or end of a clause (it has no e if it occurs at the end of a clause.

Pe question 
The affix -pe+ is used to form question words when attached to a noun, which means which. It can go before or after the noun, and it causes lenition if placed before the noun. If it is a prefix, and the noun is plural, they will combine and become pem+ (dual), pep+ (trial) or pay+ (plural).

Pronouns 

Na'vi pronouns have the same declension as any other noun. The pronouns are declined for four persons: 1st person inclusive, 1st person exclusive, 2nd person, and 3rd person animate. Most of the plural forms of the various pronouns are made from the addition of the number prefixes to the singular.

The singular inanimate 3rd person is tsa'u, the demonstrative pronoun. The reflexive pronoun is sno, and the indefinite personal pronoun is fko.

Adpositions 

Adpositions may go before or after the noun they modify. If it is before, then it is a separate word, but if after, it is an enclitic attached to the noun. For example, "with you" may either be hu nga or ngahu. When adpositions occur as prepositions, a few of them trigger lenition.

Relative clauses 

Relative clauses are formed with the particle a. If the head noun is the ergative or accusative of the phrase it modifies, it is not present in the relative clause. If the head of the relative clause uses any other case or adposition, a resumptive pronoun is used.

Conditionals 
A conditional is use the words txo and tsakrr. The condition goes after txo, and takes the subjunctive case, then the consequent goes after the tsakrr (which is often omitted) and takes the relevant case.
A counter-factual conditional uses the words zun for the condition and zel for the consequent, and uses the subjunctive in both clauses

Numbers 

Na'vi's native number system is an octal one. The numbers 0-7, 108 (8), and 1008 (64) are

The powers of eight are combined with special prefixes to create multiples of powers of eight. These are the first syllable of the corresponding number, except for 1, which has none, and 2, which has me- instead of mu-. To create a number that is a power of eight plus a number from 1 to 7, the l of vol is deleted (except for 1), and the initial consonant undergoes lenition.

Ordinals of the aforementioned numbers can be formed with the suffix -ve, but there are a few irregularities

Na'vi also has the numbers 'eyt eight and nayn nine as loanwords from English.

Sources 

Na'vi Dictionary, Edited by Mark Miller

Notes

References 

Na'vi language
Grammars of artistic languages